"Don't Stop Dancing" is a song by Creed featured on the band's third album, Weathered, in 2001. The song features Scott Stapp's sister Aimee Stapp on backup vocals and the Tallahassee Boys' Choir singing a background chorus.

Music video
The music video was directed by Dave Meyers and co-directed by Scott Stapp. It was filmed at one of Hoboken, New Jersey's oldest churches on July 28 and 29, 2002. It features cameo appearances by Scott's son, Jagger, and Scott's sister, Aimee.

Charts

Weekly charts

Year-end charts

References

External links

2002 singles
Creed (band) songs
Songs written by Mark Tremonti
Songs written by Scott Stapp
2001 songs
Wind-up Records singles

Music videos directed by Dave Meyers (director)